Elias Luis dos Reis, commonly called as Elias (born 29 October 1983) is a Brazilian football player at the position of midfielder who currently plays for Barretos.

Career
Elías began playing football with Matsubara before signing with Necaxa in 2005.

On 26 February 2014, Elías transferred to China League One side Chongqing Lifan.

Honours

Club
Chongqing Lifan
China League One: 2014

References

External links

1983 births
Living people
Brazilian footballers
Association football midfielders
Club Necaxa footballers
Liga MX players
Al-Nasr SC (Kuwait) players
Criciúma Esporte Clube players
Chongqing Liangjiang Athletic F.C. players
China League One players
Al-Fateh SC players
Dibba FC players
Mogi Mirim Esporte Clube players
Clube Atlético Linense players
Clube Atlético Bragantino players
Brazilian expatriate footballers
Expatriate footballers in Kuwait
Brazilian expatriate sportspeople in Kuwait
Expatriate footballers in China
Brazilian expatriate sportspeople in China
Saudi Professional League players
UAE Pro League players
Kuwait Premier League players